The 1999–2000 NBA season was the Pacers' 24th season in the National Basketball Association, and 33rd season as a franchise. It was also their first season playing at the Conseco Fieldhouse. During the off-season, the Pacers acquired top draft pick and high school star Jonathan Bender from the Toronto Raptors, and acquired rookie center Jeff Foster from the Golden State Warriors. The Pacers played around .500 with a 7–7 start to the season, but then won 15 of their next 17 games, and held a 32–16 record at the All-Star break. The team finished first place in the Central Division with a 56–26 record, highlighted by a franchise-best 25-game winning streak at home, which was worthy of the Eastern Conference first seed in the playoffs, guaranteed home-court advantage throughout the Eastern Conference playoffs for the first time in franchise history, and an all-time franchise best win–loss record.

Jalen Rose, who played the previous three seasons off the Pacers' bench, became the team's starting small forward replacing Chris Mullin in the lineup, averaging 18.2 points and 4.0 assists per game, and was named Most Improved Player of the Year. In addition, Reggie Miller finished second on the team in scoring averaging 18.1 points per game, while Rik Smits provided with 12.9 points, 5.1 rebounds and 1.3 blocks per game, and Dale Davis contributed 10.0 points and 9.9 rebounds per game. Austin Croshere played an increased role as the team's sixth man, averaging 10.3 points per game off the bench, while finishing in fourth place in Most Improved Player voting, while Travis Best contributed 8.9 points and 3.3 assists per game also off the bench, Mark Jackson provided with 8.1 points and 8.0 assists per game, and Sam Perkins averaged 6.6 points and 3.6 rebounds per game. Miller and Davis were both selected for the 2000 NBA All-Star Game in Oakland.

In the playoffs, the Pacers defeated the Milwaukee Bucks in five games in the Eastern Conference First Round, and the Philadelphia 76ers in six games in the Eastern Conference Semi-finals, before preceding to defeat their arch-rivals, the New York Knicks in a tough, hard-fought six-game series in the Eastern Conference Finals for the fifth time in seven years, en route to advancing to the NBA Finals for the first time in franchise history. However, the Pacers would lose in the Finals to the Los Angeles Lakers in six games.

Following the season, Larry Bird resigned as head coach after three seasons, while Davis was traded to the Portland Trail Blazers, Mullin was released and later re-signed as a free agent with his former team, the Golden State Warriors, Jackson signed with the Toronto Raptors, and Smits retired after playing 12 seasons in the NBA with the Pacers.

Offseason

NBA Draft

Roster

Regular season
The Pacers began a new era by moving into Conseco Fieldhouse after 25 years at Market Square Arena. They would start the season with a 7-7 record but finished with a 56-26 record, good enough to win their 2nd straight division title. The Pacers even won 25 straight games at their new arena.

Season standings

Record vs. opponents

Game log

Regular season

|- align="center" bgcolor="#ccffcc"
| 1
| November 2, 1999
| @ New Jersey
| W 119–112
| Miller (27)
| Davis (13)
| Jackson (5)
| Continental Airlines Arena
| 1–0
|- align="center" bgcolor="#ffcccc"
| 2
| November 4, 1999
| @ Charlotte
| L 89–98
| Miller (20)
| Davis,Rose (7)
| Jackson (7)
| Charlotte Coliseum
| 1–1
|- align="center" bgcolor="#ccffcc"
| 3
| November 6, 1999
| Boston
| W 115–108
| Miller (29)
| Davis (11)
| Jackson (8)
| Conseco Fieldhouse
| 2–1
|- align="center" bgcolor="#ffcccc"
| 4
| November 9, 1999
| @ Miami
| L 101–113
| Rose (17)
| Davis (10)
| Jackson (4)
| Miami Arena
| 2–2
|- align="center" bgcolor="#ccffcc"
| 5
| November 11, 1999
| Orlando
| W 116–101
| Miller (21)
| Rose (8)
| Rose (7)
| Conseco Fieldhouse
| 3–2
|- align="center" bgcolor="#ccffcc"
| 6
| November 13, 1999
| Washington
| W 105–83
| Rose (16)
| Davis (8)
| Best,Jackson (6)
| Conseco Fieldhouse
| 4–2
|- align="center" bgcolor="#ccffcc"
| 7
| November 15, 1999
| @ Houston
| W 96–87
| Harrington (18)
| Davis (11)
| Jackson (7)
| Compaq Center
| 5–2
|- align="center" bgcolor="#ffcccc"
| 8
| November 16, 1999
| @ San Antonio
| L 87–90 (OT)
| Rose (28)
| Davis (10)
| Jackson,Miller,Perkins (4)
| Alamodome
| 5–3
|- align="center" bgcolor="#ffcccc"
| 9
| November 19, 1999
| Atlanta
| L 99–105
| Miller,Smits (21)
| Harrington (8)
| Jackson (12)
| Conseco Fieldhouse
| 5–4
|- align="center" bgcolor="#ccffcc"
| 10
| November 20, 1999
| @ Cleveland
| W 107–98
| Rose (22)
| Croshere (8)
| Jackson,Rose (9)
| Gund Arena
| 6–4
|- align="center" bgcolor="#ffcccc"
| 11
| November 22, 1999
| @ Boston
| L 85–95
| Davis (19)
| Davis (12)
| Jackson (8)
| FleetCenter
| 6–5
|- align="center" bgcolor="#ffcccc"
| 12
| November 25, 1999
| Detroit
| L 99–107
| Smits (23)
| Davis (8)
| Jackson (10)
| Conseco Fieldhouse
| 6–6
|- align="center" bgcolor="#ccffcc"
| 13
| November 26, 1999
| Vancouver
| W 105–86
| Smits (17)
| Croshere,Smits (5)
| Best (6)
| Conseco Fieldhouse
| 7–6
|- align="center" bgcolor="#ffcccc"
| 14
| November 28, 1999
| @ Seattle
| L 91–102
| Davis (19)
| Davis (12)
| Best (5)
| Key Arena
| 7–7
|- align="center" bgcolor="#ccffcc"
| 15
| November 29, 1999
| @ Portland
| W 93–91
| Rose (22)
| Davis (12)
| Jackson (9)
| Rose Garden
| 8–7

|- align="center" bgcolor="#ccffcc"
| 16
| December 1, 1999
| @ Vancouver
| W 96–89
| Miller (26)
| Croshere (9)
| Jackson (10)
| General Motors Place
| 9–7
|- align="center" bgcolor="#ccffcc"
| 17
| December 3, 1999
| @ Utah
| W 100–75
| Miller (31)
| Davis (13)
| Jackson (9)
| Delta Center
| 10–7
|- align="center" bgcolor="#ccffcc"
| 18
| December 7, 1999
| San Antonio
| W 83–77
| Miller (23)
| Davis (16)
| Jackson (9)
| Conseco Fieldhouse
| 11–7
|- align="center" bgcolor="#ccffcc"
| 19
| December 10, 1999
| Cleveland
| W 136–88
| Smits (25)
| Davis (20)
| Miller (8)
| Conseco Fieldhouse
| 13–7
|- align="center" bgcolor="#ccffcc"
| 20
| December 11, 1999
| L.A. Clippers
| W 108–90
| Miller (26)
| Davis (18)
| Jackson (9)
| Conseco Fieldhouse
| 14–7
|- align="center" bgcolor="#ffcccc"
| 21
| December 14, 1999
| @ Toronto
| L 97–105
| Rose (21)
| Davis (10)
| Best (7)
| Air Canada Centre
| 13–8
|- align="center" bgcolor="#ccffcc"
| 22
| December 15, 1999
| Chicago
| W 102–91
| Croshere (21)
| Smits (8)
| Jackson (5)
| Conseco Fieldhouse
| 14–8
|- align="center" bgcolor="#ccffcc"
| 23
| December 17, 1999
| Utah
| W 89–74
| Miller (19)
| Croshere (11)
| Jackson (7)
| Conseco Fieldhouse
| 15–8
|- align="center" bgcolor="#ffcccc"
| 24
| December 18, 1999
| @ Milwaukee
| L 95–109
| Miller (21)
| Davis (15)
| Jackson (10)
| Bradley Center
| 15–9
|- align="center" bgcolor="#ccffcc"
| 25
| December 21, 1999
| Seattle
| W 113–103
| Miller (31)
| Davis (9)
| Jackson,Rose (11)
| Conseco Fieldhouse
| 16–9
|- align="center" bgcolor="#ccffcc"
| 26
| December 25, 1999
| New York
| W 101–90
| Miller (26)
| Croshere (10)
| Jackson (7)
| Conseco Fieldhouse
| 17–9
|- align="center" bgcolor="#ccffcc"
| 27
| December 27, 1999
| @ Chicago
| W 103–91
| Davis (21)
| Davis (8)
| Jackson (13)
| United Center
| 18–9
|- align="center" bgcolor="#ccffcc"
| 28
| December 29, 1999
| @ Atlanta
| W 116–89
| Miller (25)
| Davis (12)
| Jackson (14)
| Philips Arena
| 19–9
|- align="center" bgcolor="#ccffcc"
| 29
| December 30, 1999
| Charlotte
| W 109–99
| Miller (30)
| Davis (11)
| Jackson (11)
| Conseco Fieldhouse
| 20–9

|- align="center" bgcolor="#ccffcc"
| 30
| January 4, 2000
| New Jersey
| W 116–111
| Miller (24)
| Smits (9)
| Jackson (15)
| Conseco Fieldhouse
| 21–9
|- align="center" bgcolor="#ccffcc"
| 31
| January 6, 2000
| @ Denver
| W 102–87
| Miller (20)
| Croshere,Davis,Perkins (7)
| Jackson (10)
| Pepsi Center
| 22–9
|- align="center" bgcolor="#ffcccc"
| 32
| January 8, 2000
| @ L.A. Clippers
| L 94–107
| Best (20)
| Davis,Rose,Smits (6)
| Jackson (6)
| Staples Center
| 22–10
|- align="center" bgcolor="#ffcccc"
| 33
| January 9, 2000
| @ Sacramento
| L 113–116
| Croshere (22)
| Davis (12)
| Best (8)
| ARCO Arena
| 22–11
|- align="center" bgcolor="#ccffcc"
| 34
| January 12, 2000
| Washington
| W 117–102
| Rose (25)
| Davis (13)
| Jackson (13)
| Conseco Fieldhouse
| 23–11
|- align="center" bgcolor="#ccffcc"
| 35
| January 14, 2000
| L.A. Lakers
| W 111–102
| Miller (22)
| Croshere (12)
| Jackson (8)
| Conseco Fieldhouse
| 24–11
|- align="center" bgcolor="#ccffcc"
| 36
| January 15, 2000
| @ Orlando
| W 96–89
| Croshere (14)
| Davis (11)
| Rose (6)
| Orlando Arena
| 25–11
|- align="center" bgcolor="#ffcccc"
| 37
| January 17, 2000
| @ Minnesota
| L 100–101
| Smits (20)
| Croshere (13)
| Jackson (11)
| Target Center
| 25–12
|- align="center" bgcolor="#ccffcc"
| 38
| January 19, 2000
| Milwaukee
| W 106–84
| Miller (29)
| Davis (13)
| Jackson (12)
| Conseco Fieldhouse
| 26–12
|- align="center" bgcolor="#ffcccc"
| 39
| January 21, 2000
| @ Washington
| L 113–123
| Miller,Rose (21)
| Davis (9)
| Jackson (13)
| MCI Center
| 26–13
|- align="center" bgcolor="#ffcccc"
| 40
| January 22, 2000
| @ Philadelphia
| L 97–103
| Miller (28)
| Davis (15)
| Jackson (9)
| First Union Center
| 26–14
|- align="center" bgcolor="#ffcccc"
| 41
| January 24, 2000
| @ Chicago
| L 82–83
| Rose (18)
| Davis (11)
| Jackson (12)
| United Center
| 26–15
|- align="center" bgcolor="#ccffcc"
| 42
| January 25, 2000
| Phoenix
| W 93–87
| Miller (21)
| Davis,Rose (9)
| Jackson (8)
| Conseco Fieldhouse
| 27–15
|- align="center" bgcolor="#ccffcc"
| 43
| January 29, 2000
| Miami
| W 94–84
| Miller (30)
| Croshere,Davis (6)
| Jackson (8)
| Conseco Fieldhouse
| 28–15

|- align="center" bgcolor="#ccffcc"
| 44
| February 1, 2000
| Boston
| W 99–96
| Smits (26)
| Davis (14)
| Jackson (7)
| Conseco Fieldhouse
| 29–15
|- align="center" bgcolor="#ccffcc"
| 45
| February 4, 2000
| Sacramento
| W 104–94
| Rose (22)
| Davis (13)
| Jackson (15)
| Conseco Fieldhouse
| 30–15
|- align="center" bgcolor="#ffcccc"
| 46
| February 5, 2000
| @ Orlando
| L 102–107
| Rose (25)
| Davis (14)
| Best,Jackson,Rose (4)
| Orlando Arena
| 30–16
|- align="center" bgcolor="#ccffcc"
| 47
| February 7, 2000
| Philadelphia
| W 109–84
| Miller (32)
| Rose (7)
| McKey,Rose (6)
| Conseco Fieldhouse
| 31–16
|- align="center" bgcolor="#ccffcc"
| 48
| February 9, 2000
| @ Boston
| W 113–104
| Rose (23)
| Davis (11)
| Jackson (9)
| FleetCenter
| 32–16
|- align="center"
|colspan="9" bgcolor="#bbcaff"|All-Star Break
|- style="background:#cfc;"
|- bgcolor="#bbffbb"
|- align="center" bgcolor="#ccffcc"
| 49
| February 16, 2000
| Toronto
| W 109–101
| Rose (32)
| Davis (13)
| Jackson (15)
| Conseco Fieldhouse
| 33–16
|- align="center" bgcolor="#ccffcc"
| 50
| February 17, 2000
| @ Milwaukee
| W 92–90
| Miller (23)
| Croshere,Davis,Jackson (9)
| Jackson (9)
| Bradley Center
| 34–16
|- align="center" bgcolor="#ffcccc"
| 51
| February 19, 2000
| @ New York
| L 73–87
| Miller (16)
| Davis (16)
| Jackson (6)
| Madison Square Garden
| 34–17
|- align="center" bgcolor="#ccffcc"
| 52
| February 21, 2000
| Dallas
| W 94–93
| Rose (28)
| Davis,McKey (8)
| Jackson (6)
| Conseco Fieldhouse
| 35–17
|- align="center" bgcolor="#ccffcc"
| 53
| February 23, 2000
| @ Detroit
| W 118–111
| Smits (29)
| Smits (9)
| Jackson (14)
| The Palace of Auburn Hills
| 36–17
|- align="center" bgcolor="#ccffcc"
| 54
| February 24, 2000
| Chicago
| W 100–83
| Rose (22)
| McKey (10)
| Jackson (7)
| Conseco Fieldhouse
| 37–17
|- align="center" bgcolor="#ccffcc"
| 55
| February 26, 2000
| Golden State
| W 104–88
| Rose (29)
| Perkins (7)
| Jackson (9)
| Conseco Fieldhouse
| 38–17
|- align="center" bgcolor="#ccffcc"
| 56
| February 29, 2000
| Detroit
| W 115–105
| Miller (24)
| Smits (12)
| Jackson (13)
| Conseco Fieldhouse
| 39–17

|- align="center" bgcolor="#ffcccc"
| 57
| March 2, 2000
| @ Phoenix
| L 87–118
| Best (20)
| Croshere,Davis (9)
| Jackson (8)
| America West Arena
| 39–18
|- align="center" bgcolor="#ffcccc"
| 58
| March 3, 2000
| @ L.A. Lakers
| L 92–107
| Miller (22)
| Davis (13)
| Jackson (6)
| Staples Center
| 39–19
|- align="center" bgcolor="#ccffcc"
| 59
| March 5, 2000
| @ Golden State
| W 114–95
| Croshere (18)
| Davis (8)
| Jackson (8)
| The Arena in Oakland
| 40–19
|- align="center" bgcolor="#ccffcc"
| 60
| March 7, 2000
| Denver
| W 90–89
| Rose (19)
| Davis (11)
| Rose (9)
| Conseco Fieldhouse
| 41–19
|- align="center" bgcolor="#ccffcc"
| 61
| March 9, 2000
| Portland
| W 127–119 (OT)
| Jackson (23)
| Davis (13)
| Jackson (9)
| Conseco Fieldhouse
| 42–19
|- align="center" bgcolor="#ccffcc"
| 62
| March 10, 2000
| @ Cleveland
| W 95–92
| Miller (28)
| McKey,Smits (8)
| Jackson (9)
| Gund Arena
| 43–19
|- align="center" bgcolor="#ffcccc"
| 63
| March 12, 2000
| Miami
| L 96–105
| Miller (26)
| Davis (8)
| Jackson (7)
| Conseco Fieldhouse
| 43–20
|- align="center" bgcolor="#ffcccc"
| 64
| March 14, 2000
| @ Dallas
| L 90–111
| Best (26)
| Croshere,Rose (13)
| Best (5)
| Reunion Arena
| 43–21
|- align="center" bgcolor="#ccffcc"
| 65
| March 15, 2000
| @ Atlanta
| W 113–107
| Rose (32)
| Croshere (11)
| Jackson (10)
| Philips Arena
| 44–21
|- align="center" bgcolor="#ccffcc"
| 66
| March 17, 2000
| Houston
| W 111–102
| Rose (35)
| Croshere (13)
| Jackson (8)
| Conseco Fieldhouse
| 45–21
|- align="center" bgcolor="#ccffcc"
| 67
| March 18, 2000
| Charlotte
| W 113–99
| Rose (22)
| Smits (12)
| Jackson (9)
| Conseco Fieldhouse
| 46–21
|- align="center" bgcolor="#ccffcc"
| 68
| March 21, 2000
| New York
| W 95–91
| Rose (28)
| Croshere (8)
| Jackson (7)
| Conseco Fieldhouse
| 47–21
|- align="center" bgcolor="#ffcccc"
| 69
| March 23, 2000
| Milwaukee
| L 84–105
| Rose (22)
| Croshere (7)
| Jackson (5)
| Conseco Fieldhouse
| 47–22
|- align="center" bgcolor="#ffcccc"
| 70
| March 26, 2000
| Philadelphia
| L 101–111
| Rose (19)
| Smits (7)
| Best,Jackson (5)
| Conseco Fieldhouse
| 47–23
|- align="center" bgcolor="#ffcccc"
| 71
| March 28, 2000
| @ New Jersey
| L 106–111
| Rose (27)
| Croshere (10)
| Jackson (11)
| Continental Airlines Arena
| 47–24
|- align="center" bgcolor="#ccffcc"
| 72
| March 31, 2000
| Minnesota
| W 109–85
| Best (27)
| Davis,Perkins (9)
| Best (7)
| Conseco Fieldhouse
| 48–24

|- align="center" bgcolor="#ccffcc"
| 73
| April 2, 2000
| @ Toronto
| W 104–83
| Rose (23)
| Davis,Perkins (7)
| Jackson (10)
| Air Canada Centre
| 49–24
|- align="center" bgcolor="#ccffcc"
| 74
| April 5, 2000
| New Jersey
| W 105–101
| Smits (25)
| Davis (11)
| Jackson (8)
| Conseco Fieldhouse
| 50–24
|- align="center" bgcolor="#ccffcc"
| 75
| April 7, 2000
| Cleveland
| W 95–94
| Rose (26)
| Rose (13)
| Jackson (6)
| Conseco Fieldhouse
| 51–24
|- align="center" bgcolor="#ffcccc"
| 76
| April 9, 2000
| @ Charlotte
| L 80–96
| Rose (18)
| Davis (14)
| Jackson (8)
| Charlotte Coliseum
| 51–25
|- align="center" bgcolor="#ffcccc"
| 77
| April 10, 2000
| @ New York
| L 81–83
| Jackson (13)
| Davis (12)
| Jackson (5)
| Madison Square Garden
| 51–26
|- align="center" bgcolor="#ccffcc"
| 78
| April 12, 2000
| Toronto
| W 77–74
| Rose (24)
| Davis (14)
| Jackson,Rose (4)
| Conseco Fieldhouse
| 52–26
|- align="center" bgcolor="#ccffcc"
| 79
| April 14, 2000
| @ Miami
| W 105–101
| Miller (26)
| Davis (7)
| Jackson (5)
| American Airlines Arena
| 53–26
|- align="center" bgcolor="#ccffcc"
| 80
| April 16, 2000
| @ Detroit
| W 112–101
| Miller (21)
| Davis (15)
| Jackson (9)
| The Palace of Auburn Hills
| 54–26
|- align="center" bgcolor="#ccffcc"
| 81
| April 17, 2000
| @ Philadelphia
| W 92–90
| Mullin (21)
| Smits (10)
| Rose (9)
| First Union Center
| 55–26
|- align="center" bgcolor="#ccffcc"
| 82
| April 19, 2000
| Atlanta
| W 111–92
| Rose (19)
| Foster (13)
| Jackson (8)
| Conseco Fieldhouse
| 56–26

Playoffs

|- align="center" bgcolor="#ccffcc"
| 1
| April 23, 2000
| Milwaukee
| W 88–85
| Rose (26)
| Davis (17)
| Jackson (11)
| Conseco Fieldhouse18,345
| 1–0
|- align="center" bgcolor="#ffcccc"
| 2
| April 27, 2000
| Milwaukee
| L 91–104
| Croshere (16)
| Davis (12)
| Jackson (5)
| Conseco Fieldhouse18,345
| 1–1
|- align="center" bgcolor="#ccffcc"
| 3
| April 29, 2000
| @ Milwaukee
| W 109–96
| Miller (34)
| Croshere (11)
| Miller,Rose (5)
| Bradley Center18,717
| 2–1
|- align="center" bgcolor="#ffcccc"
| 4
| May 1, 2000
| @ Milwaukee
| L 87–100
| Rose (17)
| Davis (10)
| Jackson (6)
| Bradley Center18,072
| 2–2
|- align="center" bgcolor="#ccffcc"
| 5
| May 4, 2000
| Milwaukee
| W 96–95
| Miller (41)
| Davis (12)
| Jackson (8)
| Conseco Fieldhouse18,345
| 3–2
|-

|-
|- align="center" bgcolor="#ccffcc"
| 1
| May 6, 2000
| Philadelphia
| W 108–91
| Miller,Rose (40)
| Croshere (11)
| Jackson (10)
| Conseco Fieldhouse18,345
| 1–0
|- align="center" bgcolor="#ccffcc"
| 2
| May 8, 2000
| Philadelphia
| W 103–97
| Rose (30)
| Rose (7)
| Jackson (14)
| Conseco Fieldhouse18,345
| 2–0
|- align="center" bgcolor="#ccffcc"
| 3
| May 10, 2000
| @ Philadelphia
| W 97–89
| Miller (29)
| Davis (17)
| Jackson (8)
| First Union Center20,823
| 3–0
|- align="center" bgcolor="#ffcccc"
| 4
| May 13, 2000
| @ Philadelphia
| L 90–92
| Smits (20)
| Davis (11)
| Jackson (7)
| First Union Center20,675
| 3–1
|- align="center" bgcolor="#ffcccc"
| 5
| May 15, 2000
| Philadelphia
| L 86–107
| Smits (15)
| Davis (8)
| Jackson,Rose (6)
| Conseco Fieldhouse18,345
| 3–2
|- align="center" bgcolor="#ccffcc"
| 6
| May 19, 2000
| @ Philadelphia
| W 106–90
| Miller (25)
| Davis (11)
| Jackson (11)
| First Union Center20,969
| 4–2
|-

|-
|- align="center" bgcolor="#ccffcc"
| 1
| May 23, 2000
| New York
| W 102–88
| Croshere (22)
| Davis (16)
| Jackson (13)
| Conseco Fieldhouse18,345
| 1–0
|- align="center" bgcolor="#ccffcc"
| 2
| May 25, 2000
| New York
| W 88–84
| Rose (24)
| Davis (16)
| Jackson (5)
| Conseco Fieldhouse18,345
| 2–0
|- align="center" bgcolor="#ffcccc"
| 3
| May 27, 2000
| @ New York
| L 95–98
| Rose (26)
| Davis (16)
| Jackson,Rose (6)
| Madison Square Garden19,763
| 2–1
|- align="center" bgcolor="#ffcccc"
| 4
| May 29, 2000
| @ New York
| L 89–91
| Miller (24)
| Davis (11)
| Jackson (7)
| Madison Square Garden19,763
| 2–2
|- align="center" bgcolor="#ccffcc"
| 5
| May 31, 2000
| New York
| W 88–79
| Best (24)
| McKey (9)
| Jackson (7)
| Conseco Fieldhouse18,345
| 3–2
|- align="center" bgcolor="#ccffcc"
| 6
| June 2, 2000
| @ New York
| W 93–80
| Miller (34)
| Davis (16)
| Best,Jackson (4)
| Madison Square Garden19,763
| 4–2
|-

|-
|- align="center" bgcolor="#ffcccc"
| 1
| June 7, 2000
| @ L.A. Lakers
| L 87–104
| Jackson (18)
| Davis (8)
| Jackson (7)
| Staples Center18,997
| 0–1
|- align="center" bgcolor="#ffcccc"
| 2
| June 9, 2000
| @ L.A. Lakers
| L 104–111
| Rose (30)
| Davis (10)
| Jackson (8)
| Staples Center18,997
| 0–2
|- align="center" bgcolor="#ccffcc"
| 3
| June 11, 2000
| L.A. Lakers
| W 100–91
| Miller (33)
| Davis (12)
| Jackson (6)
| Conseco Fieldhouse18,345
| 1–2
|- align="center" bgcolor="#ffcccc"
| 4
| June 14, 2000
| L.A. Lakers
| L 118–120 (OT)
| Miller (35)
| Davis (8)
| Jackson (7)
| Conseco Fieldhouse18,345
| 1–3
|- align="center" bgcolor="#ccffcc"
| 5
| June 16, 2000
| L.A. Lakers
| W 120–87
| Rose (32)
| Croshere (9)
| Jackson (7)
| Conseco Fieldhouse18,345
| 2–3
|- align="center" bgcolor="#ffcccc"
| 6
| June 19, 2000
| @ L.A. Lakers
| L 111–116
| Rose (29)
| Davis (14)
| Jackson (11)
| Staples Center18,997
| 2–4
|-

Player statistics

Regular season

Playoffs

NBA Finals
 Lakers' backup center John Salley became the first player in NBA history to play on three different championship-winning franchises, as he won titles in 1989 and '90 with the Detroit Pistons and 1996 with the Chicago Bulls.
 This was the Lakers first NBA Finals in the new Staples Center.
 After closing out game 6, fans rioted outside Staples Center by making bonfires, tipping cars, breaking windows of cars and buildings, and vandalizing businesses around the area. Overall, they caused $1 million in damages. In Lakers' championship run the following year, the LAPD came out in bigger force after the Lakers won and prevented the same thing from happening again.
 Staples Center, which was a first-year building in 2000, had a very tricky shooting background and opposing teams often had difficulty shooting there. Pacers coach Larry Bird wanted to have a shoot-around in the arena the day before Game 6 to help his team shoot more consistently because they shot very poorly in Games 1 and 2. However, the Pacers couldn't practice in the building because of an Arena Football game. Bird was very upset about this, and his team had to go down to the Lakers practice facility in El Segundo.
 The two arenas in this series, Conseco Fieldhouse and Staples Center, were both first-year arenas.

Summary 
The following scoring summary is written in a line score format, except that the quarter numbers are replaced by game numbers.

Aspects 

Although the Lakers were one of the more talented teams in the NBA the previous year, they failed to win a single game against the San Antonio Spurs in the 1999 NBA Playoffs. Twenty-four days after being swept by the eventual league champion, the Lakers signed Phil Jackson as head coach. Jackson, famous for coaching Michael Jordan and the six-time champion Chicago Bulls, would build his triangle offense around Shaquille O'Neal and Kobe Bryant. general manager Jerry West surrounded O'Neal and Bryant with effective role players such as Glen Rice, Ron Harper (who had experience with Jackson's triangle offense as part of the '96–'98  Bulls), and A. C. Green (member of the last two Lakers championship teams).

Along with these starters, the Lakers also possessed a strong bench. Robert Horry not only had championship experience with the Houston Rockets but also was a threat on the perimeter and a defensive star. Derek Fisher was a defensively minded point-guard with the ability to shoot well from long range. Rick Fox, acquired after being released by the Boston Celtics, was the Lakers' sixth man. With a healthy O'Neal, the Lakers dominated the regular season, with winning streaks of 11, 16, and 19 en route to a 67–15 record, tying the 1992 Chicago Bulls and 1986 Boston Celtics as the fifth best record in NBA regular season history.

Although many expected the Lakers to reach the Finals, the road would be a rocky one. In the first round, the Lakers won the first two games against the Sacramento Kings, only to drop the next two games in Sacramento. The Lakers then defeated Sacramento in Game 5, 113–86, to face the Phoenix Suns in the conference semi-finals. The Lakers clobbered the Suns, winning the series 4–1 (with their only loss coming in Game 4). In Game 1 of the Western Conference Finals against the Portland Trail Blazers, Rasheed Wallace earned two technical fouls and was ejected; the Lakers took advantage of Wallace's absence and secured victory. The Trail Blazers stormed back in the next game, giving the Lakers their worst home loss of the season in a 106–77 shellacking. This setback did not affect Los Angeles, as they assembled a 3–1 series lead by winning the next two games in Portland. The Lakers underestimated the Trail Blazers, however. Led by former Jackson linchpin Scottie Pippen, Portland won back-to-back elimination games and forced a series-deciding Game 7. Amid several controversial foul calls by referee Dick Bavetta against members of the Trail Blazers, Portland relinquished a 75–60 fourth quarter lead. Rallying back with a 25–4 run, the Lakers won the game and secured a berth in the NBA Finals.

In the 1997–1998 NBA season, the Chicago Bulls narrowly defeated the Pacers, 4 games to 3, in the Eastern Conference Finals. The 1998–1999 NBA season began with a lockout but saw Indiana return to the Eastern Conference Finals, where they fell to the New York Knicks. The 1999–2000 NBA season brought several major changes to the Pacers. It was their first season at Conseco Fieldhouse, as well as their first since 1993 without center Antonio Davis, who was traded for the rights to the No. 5 overall pick in the 1999 NBA Draft. Jalen Rose replaced Chris Mullin in the starting line up, winning the NBA Most Improved Player award, while Austin Croshere replaced him as the sixth man.

The Pacers started the season 7–7 but eventually finished with an Eastern Conference best 56–26 record, including a franchise-best 25 game win streak at home. The Pacers, like the Lakers, struggled in the playoffs. They needed a clutch Travis Best three-pointer to dispatch the Milwaukee Bucks in five games. Indiana faced the Philadelphia 76ers in the second round and took the series in six games, earning a trip to the Eastern Conference Finals. The Pacers would face their rival Knicks, winning a memorable six game series in a reversal of fortunes from years past. With the victory, Indiana advanced to the first NBA Finals in franchise history, becoming the second former ABA team to do so.

Game 1 
Wednesday, June 7, 2000, 9:00 at the Staples Center.

The Lakers dominated from the start. The Lakers shot 15-for-20 (75%) in the first period while the Pacers shot only 7-for-20 (35%). Miller would miss all of his shots in the first quarter to give the Lakers a 15-point lead. Croshere came off the bench to keep the Pacers alive in the 2nd quarter, scoring 9 points and grabbing 4 rebounds in the quarter. Although the Pacers attempted a comeback in the 2nd quarter, they were still down by 12. In the 3rd quarter, it would be Jackson who led the Pacers to a comeback, cutting the Lakers lead by 2. Miller also hit his first field goal in the 3rd quarter, though it would be his last. The Lakers handled the Pacers in the final quarter, with a 13–2 run winning by 17 points. O'Neal scored 43 points and grabbed 19 rebounds.

Game 2 
Friday, June 9, 2000, 9:00 at the Staples Center.

Los Angeles and Indiana were evenly matched for the first quarter, both scoring 28. However, Los Angeles suffered a major setback when Kobe Bryant left the game in the 2nd quarter due to a sprained ankle and did not return. Jalen Rose later admitted that he intentionally stuck out his foot when Kobe shot a jumpshot in order to trip him when he landed. Ron Harper went in for Bryant and scored 21 points for the game. Desperate to try to gain the lead, Larry Bird resorted to the "Hack-a-Shaq" strategy.  Shaq shot 39 free throws, making only 18, an NBA record for most free throws attempted. Despite this low percentage, Shaq made 9 of 16 in the 4th quarter to keep a Lakers lead. The Pacers cut the lead to 99–96 and were looking to foul Shaq, but when Shaq got the ball he passed to Robert Horry who converted not only the layup, but the foul shot as well giving them a 102–96 lead en route to a 111–104 Lakers victory.

Game 3 
Sunday, June 11, 2000, 7:30 at the Conseco Fieldhouse.

Taking advantage of Kobe Bryant's ankle injury, Indiana restored a semblance of parity to the proceedings. Kobe's absence was felt as the Pacers had an 11–2 run in the first quarter to take an 8-point lead. Austin Croshere once again had another huge 2nd quarter, scoring 8 points as the Pacers shot 61% from the field. The Lakers tried to make a run to get back into the game, but upon doings so, Indiana answered with 12 straight points and led by 17. The Lakers were desperate and attempted another run to get within 3 points, but Reggie Miller nailed all his free throws at the end of the game to give Indiana a 9-point win.

Game 4 
Wednesday, June 14, 2000, 9:00 at the Conseco Fieldhouse.

The Pacers took a quick 9–2 lead due to Rik Smits hitting his first four shots. Kobe Bryant attempted to play with his sore ankle but only managed to score 6 points in the first half. Even though Bryant and O'Neal were in foul trouble in the first half (each picking up his third with 5 minutes remaining in the second quarter), Indiana could not take advantage and did not extend their lead. This would be a problem as Kobe Bryant scored 10 points and the Lakers took a 62–60 lead due to a Glen Rice three-pointer. The game remained close going into the fourth quarter, when O'Neal and Reggie Miller scored 14 and 13 points respectively, sending the game into overtime. Midway through overtime, O'Neal committed his sixth foul but 21-year-old Bryant delivered three clutch shots, as the Lakers were able to overcome back-up center John Salley's inability to effectively defend Smits. Smits and Miller scored all 14 of Indiana's OT points, but it was not enough to overcome as Miller missed a last-second three-pointer, and L.A. was able to pull one out in Indianapolis.

Game 5 
Friday, June 16, 2000, 9:00 at the Conseco Fieldhouse.

Reggie Miller and the Pacers dominated the game from the start in what would be Larry Bird's last game as a coach in the state of Indiana. Reggie Miller came out and made 5 straight shots including a 4-point play. The Pacers hit their first 6 three-point shots in the game. The Pacers would have a 20-point lead in the 2nd quarter, and eventually won by 33 – it was the worst Lakers NBA Finals loss since the 148–114 loss to Boston in the 1985 NBA Finals, known as the "Memorial Day Massacre."

With their loss in Game 5, the Lakers record in close-out games dropped to 3–6 in the 2000 NBA Playoffs (the other losses coming in Games 3 and 4 in the first round against Sacramento, Game 4 in the series against Phoenix, and Games 5 and 6 versus Portland). As a result, the series returned to California.

Game 6 
Monday, June 19, 2000, 9:00 at the Staples Center.

After the two teams traded blows in the first quarter, Mark Jackson concluded the period with a turn-around half-court shot at the buzzer to give the Pacers a 26–24 advantage. They would not relinquish their lead until the fourth quarter. In the first half, the Pacers would lead by as many as twelve points. However, the Lakers chipped away and entered intermission trailing 56–53. Indiana, however, added two more points to their lead, and entered the final period in a position to force a decisive seventh game.

In the fourth quarter, the momentum shifted. The Lakers got four timely three-pointers from Derek Fisher, Robert Horry, and Rick Fox. The turning point occurred on a play where Brian Shaw stole the ball from Jalen Rose, leading to a fast break where Shaquille O'Neal hit an off-balance shot to give the Lakers the lead. The Pacers never led after that point.

The Lakers would build a seven-point lead, but the Pacers fought back to tie the score at 103. After a timeout, the Lakers scored six unanswered points to regain control. The Pacers made one final valiant effort, but it fell short and the Lakers clinched their first championship in twelve years. Shaquille O'Neal led all scorers with 41 points and also pulled down 12 rebounds. He was awarded the Finals MVP.

Awards, records, and honors
 Jalen Rose, NBA Most Improved Player Award
 Reggie Miller, NBA All-Star Game
 Dale Davis, NBA All-Star Game

Transactions

References

  Pacers on Basketball Reference

Indiana Pacers seasons
Eastern Conference (NBA) championship seasons
Indiana
Pace
Pace